Til Death is the debut studio album by Australian metalcore band, Capture the Crown. The album was produced by Cameron Mizell at Chango Studios in Orlando, Florida and mastered by Joey Sturgis at Foundation Recording Studio in Connersville, Indiana. The album was released on 18 December 2012 through Sumerian Records. It peaked at No. 19 on the ARIA Heatseekers Albums, and in the United States it appeared on three Billboard component charts Top Hard Rock (No. 21), Top Heatseekers (No. 7), and Top Independent Albums (No. 25).

Four singles, "You Call That a Knife? This Is a Knife!", "#OIMATEWTF", "Ladies & Gentlemen...I Give You Hell!", and "RVG", have been released prior to the release of the album. "Help Me to Help You" is speculated to be a re-recorded version of the song "Help Me to Help You Mr. Phil," which was performed by the band's previous incarnation, Atlanta Takes State.

It is the only album to feature original guitarist Blake Ellis.
The album is mainly supported by the lead single "You Call That a Knife? This Is a Knife!". It became an internet hit, gaining over 13 Million views on YouTube. On April 3, 2020, the official video for the song, along with the official video for the single  "#OIMATEWTF" were removed from YouTube for unknown reasons.

Track listing

Personnel
Capture the Crown
Jeffrey Wellfare – vocals
Blake Ellis – rhythm guitar
Jye Menzies – lead guitar
Kris Sheehan – bass
Tyler "Lone America" March – drums

Production
Produced by Cameron Mizell at Chango Studios in Orlando, Florida
Mastered by Joey Sturgis at Foundation Recording Studios in Connorsville, Indiana
Guest vocals on "#OIMATEWTF" by Denis Shaforostov (ex-Make Me Famous, ex-Down & Dirty, ex-Asking Alexandria)

References

2012 debut albums
Capture (band) albums
Sumerian Records albums
Albums produced by Cameron Mizell